Waconda Lake, also known as Glen Elder Reservoir, is a reservoir in Mitchell County and Osborne County, Kansas, United States. Built and managed by the U.S. Bureau of Reclamation for flood control and irrigation, it is also used for recreation. Glen Elder State Park is located on its north shore.

History
Prior to the building of Glen Elder Dam, the present-day site of Waconda Lake was the location of Waconda Spring, a natural flowing artesian well, from which the lake was named. To capitalize on it, in 1904 the Cawker City Mineral Company opened a resort on the site of the spring. In 1907, G.F. Abraham of Mankato, Kansas converted the resort into a health spa.

Part of the Pick–Sloan Missouri Basin Program authorized by the Flood Control Act of 1944, Glen Elder Dam was one of six units in the Smoky Hill River basin specified as necessary for flood control and irrigation. The U.S. Bureau of Reclamation began purchasing rights-of-way in June 1963 and started constructing the dam and Waconda Lake in November 1964. Despite efforts to preserve Waconda Spring as a national monument, the health spa was torn down, and, in 1968, the spring itself was sealed. Construction finished in January 1969, and the spring was submerged beneath the new reservoir.

Finding the Solomon River inadequate as a municipal water supply, the nearby city of Beloit, Kansas successfully requested use of Waconda Lake. In addition, the reservoir went on to provide water to three rural districts. In November 1976, the Kansas State Board of Agriculture approved Glen Elder Irrigation District-No. 8, enabling use of the reservoir for irrigation.

Geography
It lies in north-central Kansas in the Smoky Hills region of the Great Plains. Most of Waconda Lake lies in Mitchell County with a small portion of its northwestern arm extending into Osborne County.

The reservoir is impounded at its eastern end by Glen Elder Dam. The North Fork Solomon River and South Fork Solomon River are the reservoir's primary inflows from the west. The Solomon River is its primary outflow to the east. Smaller tributaries, from west to east, include Oak Creek and Granite Creek which flow into the reservoir from the north and Carr Creek, Mill Creek, and Walnut Creek which flow into the reservoir from the south.

U.S. Route 24 and Kansas Highway 9 run concurrently east-west along the reservoir's north shore. Glen Elder Dam Road, a paved county road, runs north-south across the top of the dam. Lake Drive, another paved county road, runs north-south across the reservoir's western end.

There are two settlements on Waconda Lake's north shore:  Cawker City at the western end and Glen Elder at the eastern end.

Hydrography
The surface area, surface elevation, and water volume of the reservoir fluctuate based on inflow and local climatic conditions. In terms of capacity, the Bureau of Reclamation vertically divides the reservoir into a set of pools based on volume and water level, and it considers the reservoir full when filled to the capacity of its active conservation pool.

Since the reservoir's initial flooding, sedimentation has gradually accumulated on the reservoir bottom thus raising its elevation.

Infrastructure
A spillway structure controlled by twelve 50-foot radial gates is located at the south end of the dam. It empties into a channel that joins the Solomon River approximately one mile to the east. A separate outlet works structure at the north end of the dam manages outflow into the river itself.

Management
The U.S. Bureau of Reclamation operates and maintains both Glen Elder Dam and Waconda Lake. The Kansas Department of Wildlife, Parks and Tourism (KDWPT) manages  of land around the reservoir as the Glen Elder Wildlife Area.

Parks and recreation
The KDWPT operates Glen Elder State Park located on the north shore of the reservoir's eastern end.  The park includes a visitor's center, a marina, an amphitheater, boat ramps, hiking trails, swimming beaches, camping facilities, and the Waconda Heritage Village. It also hosts the annual Waconda Indian Festival.

Waconda Lake is open for sport fishing year-round. The lake contains many top fishing spots, such as The Bluffs, The Dam, Granite Creek and the River.

Points of interest
The Waconda Heritage Village is a living museum in Glen Elder State Park. It features Hopewell Church, which was relocated to the park in 1994, and a full-scale replica of Waconda Spring.

Wildlife
Channel catfish, crappie, flathead catfish, striped bass, walleye, and white bass are fish species resident in Waconda Lake. Game animals living around the reservoir include mule deer, pheasants, quail, turkeys, and whitetail deer. Doves, ducks, and geese migrate through the area seasonally. Bald eagles and golden eagles visit in winter.

See also
 List of Kansas state parks
 List of lakes, reservoirs, and dams in Kansas
 List of rivers of Kansas

References

External links
 Glen Elder Dam, U.S. Bureau of Reclamation
 Glen Elder State Park, Kansas Department of Wildlife, Parks and Tourism
 Glen Elder Unit, U.S. Bureau of Reclamation
 Glen Elder Wildlife Area, Kansas Department of Wildlife, Parks and Tourism

Bodies of water of Mitchell County, Kansas
Bodies of water of Osborne County, Kansas
Reservoirs in Kansas